Robert Threshie Reid, 1st Earl Loreburn,  (3 April 1846 – 30 November 1923) was a British lawyer, judge and radical Liberal politician. He served as Lord High Chancellor of Great Britain between 1905 and 1912.

Background and education
Born in Corfu, the largest city on the island of the same name, Loreburn was the son of Sir James John Reid, Chief Justice of the Ionian Islands, at the time a British proctectorate. His mother was Mary, daughter of Robert Threshie. Loreburn was educated at Cheltenham College and Balliol College, Oxford. While at Oxford, he represented the Oxford University Cricket Club in fifteen first-class matches as a wicket-keeper, spanning from 1865 to 1868. He remained involved in cricket for many years after, with appearances for the Marylebone Cricket Club (MCC) and Herefordshire at lower levels of the sport, amongst other sides.

Political career
Loreburn's national political career began in 1880, when he was elected to the House of Commons as Member of Parliament for Hereford. He stayed there until 1885, when he ran unsuccessfully in Dunbartonshire, but returned to the Commons in 1886 for Dumfries Burghs. He remained in the House of Commons until 1905; during this time period, he was appointed to the offices of Solicitor General and knighted (1894) and Attorney General (1894–1895). He was appointed a Knight Grand Cross of the Order of St Michael and St George (GCMG) in 1899. He left the House of Commons in 1905, though, and became Lord Chancellor under Sir Henry Campbell-Bannerman On his appointment he was raised to the peerage as Baron Loreburn, of Dumfries in the County of Dumfries. (The Loreburn was a stream which historically ran close to Dumfries, and which was the source of the town's motto and rallying cry, "A Lore Burne".)

During the 1900s and 1910s, many Liberal politicians took up the ideology of Liberal Imperialism, led by the Chancellor of the Exchequer (H. H. Asquith), the Secretary of State for War (Richard Haldane) and the Secretary of State for Foreign Affairs (Sir Edward Grey). This triumvirate of politicians was strongly in favour of an entente with France, along with the creation of a British Expeditionary Force, in the event of a war between France and Germany. These three politicians made their views known, and when Campbell-Bannerman appointed his cabinet, he appointed Loreburn Lord Chancellor as a counter to the Liberal Imperialists.

In 1908, Asquith became Prime Minister. Lord Loreburn's disagreements with Haldane, Grey, Asquith, and eventually David Lloyd George became more prominent. Asquith, Lloyd George, Grey, Churchill, and Haldane met secretly on 23 August 1911, and when certain Cabinet members found out, they were furious. Reginald McKenna had recently been deprived of his position as First Lord of the Admiralty for refusing to provide military aid to the French, and he led the majority (whose members included Loreburn, McKenna, Colonial Secretary Lewis Vernon Harcourt, and Chancellor of the Duchy of Lancaster Jack Pease) in "a strong line about Cabinet supremacy over all other bodies in the matter of sea and land defence". Lord Esher wrote, "There has been a serious crisis. Fifteen members of the Cabinet against five. The Entente is decidedly imperilled."

He was created Earl Loreburn on 4 July 1911. Unfortunately, Lord Loreburn's health began declining, and in the summer of 1912, he resigned his Lord Chancellorship. In a parting, "valedictory" letter to Lord Haldane, he wrote:

During the July Crisis Loreburn opposed British intervention in the impending continental war. On 31 July 1914 the Manchester Guardian, to his delight, attacked the way in which Britain appeared to have been secretly committed to the side of France and Russia.

In January 1918, the House of Lords came to consider the Bill which went on to become the Representation of the People Act 1918, for the first time introducing a limited women's suffrage. Loreburn moved an amendment to delete from the Bill the sections which would give the vote to women, but the Lords were not persuaded and on a division the amendment was lost by 134 votes against to 71 in favour.

Personal life

Lord Loreburn married firstly Emily, daughter of A. C. Fleming, in 1871. After her death in August 1904 he married secondly Violet Elizabeth, daughter of William Frederick Hicks-Beach, in 1907. There were no children from either marriage. Lord Loreburn died on 30 November 1923, aged 77, when his titles became extinct.

Arms

See also

References

The Anglo-French Entente

External links 

 
 

|-

Loreburn, Robert Reid, 1st Earl
Loreburn, Robert Reid, 1st Earl
Alumni of Balliol College, Oxford
Attorneys General for England and Wales
Loreburn, Robert Reid, 1st Earl
Loreburn, Robert Reid, 1st Earl
People educated at Cheltenham College
Solicitors General for England and Wales
Liberal Party (UK) MPs for English constituencies
Scottish Liberal Party MPs
UK MPs 1880–1885
UK MPs 1886–1892
UK MPs 1892–1895
UK MPs 1895–1900
UK MPs 1900–1906
UK MPs who were granted peerages
Knights Grand Cross of the Order of St Michael and St George
English cricketers
Oxford University cricketers
Presidents of the Marylebone Cricket Club
Sportspeople from Gloucestershire
Knights Bachelor
Members of the Privy Council of the United Kingdom
Members of the Judicial Committee of the Privy Council
Peers created by Edward VII
Peers created by George V
Wicket-keepers